Propylhexedrine, most commonly sold under the brand name Benzedrex, is a topical nasal decongestant with adrenergic properties. It is most commonly used for relief of congestion due to colds, allergies, and allergic rhinitis. 

Propylhexedrine is most commonly found in over-the-counter Benzedrex inhalers. Benzedrex was first manufactured by Smith, Kline and French as a safer alternative and eventual replacement to Benzedrine. Benzedrex is currently manufactured by B.F. Ascher & Co. Inc. Pharmaceuticals.

Medical use
Propylhexedrine is used to treat acute nasal congestion related to common cold, allergies and hay fever. For nasal congestion, the dosage is listed as four inhalations (two inhalations per nostril) every two hours for adults and children 6–12 years of age. Each inhalation delivers 0.4 to 0.5 milligram (400 to 500 μg) in 800 millilitres of air. 

Historically, it has also been used for weight loss in oral tablet preparations at doses ranging from 5 to 30 milligrams. The use of oral propylhexedrine tablets for weight loss is not generally recognized as safe and effective by the Food and Drug Administration; therefore, no medications containing propylhexedrine are currently approved for weight loss in the United States.

Contraindications
Propylhexedrine should not be used if a MAOI has been used in the past 14 days or is currently in use, as this can result in hypertensive crisis. People with cardiovascular disease should not use propylhexedrine.

Additionally, stimulant drugs and sympathomimetics should not be taken with propylhexedrine, as this can lead to a potentially dangerous spike in blood pressure and irregular heart rhythms.

There is one case of death where a combination of propylhexedrine, acetaminophen, morphine, promethazine, and kratom was detected. However, the study indicates that propylhexedrine was most likely the principal cause.

Pharmacology
Propylhexedrine is a TAAR1 agonist, like amphetamine. Consequently, it reverses the transporters for dopamine, norepinephrine, and serotonin, leading to a release of monoamines from presynaptic vesicles into the synaptic cleft. The increased level of monoamines within the synapse results in increased activity at their respective receptors. Additionally, propylhexedrine appears to inhibit VMAT2, leading to a further increase in the aforementioned monoamines. The pharmacological actions of propylhexedrine are similar to that of structurally similar stimulant phenethylamines, such as amphetamine.

Metabolism
Propylhexedrine undergoes metabolism to form various metabolites including norpropylhexedrine, cyclohexylacetoxime, cis- and trans-4-hydroxypropylhexedrine.

Chemistry
Freebase propylhexedrine is a volatile, oily liquid at room temperature. The slow evaporation of freebase propylhexedrine allows it to be administered via inhalation. As an amine, it can easily be protonated to form various salts, such as propylhexedrine hydrochloride, propylhexedrine citrate, or propylhexedrine acetate, depending on the acid used. These salts are stable, clear to off-white crystalline substances that readily dissolve in water.

Propylhexedrine is structurally similar to phenylethylamines, with the only structural difference being the substitution of an alicyclic cyclohexyl group for the aromatic phenyl group of phenethylamine. Propylhexedrine is not an amphetamine, nor even a phenethylamine, but instead can be referred to as a cycloalkyl amine, or more specifically a cyclohexylethylamine being the N,a-dimethyl derivative of 2-cyclohexylethylamine.

Propylhexedrine is a chiral compound (the α-carbon is chiral), and the active ingredient contained in Benzedrex inhalers is racemic (RS)-propylhexedrine as the free base. (S)-Propylhexedrine, also known as levopropylhexedrine, is believed to be the more biologically active isomer of the two. 
The dextrorotatory counterpart, which is mainly unused, is dextropropylhexedrine.
(S)-Propylhexedrine can be synthesized from dextromethamphetamine.

Synthesis
Propylhexedrine can be synthesized starting with cyclohexylacetone in a similar fashion to the phenylacetone synthesis of methamphetamine.

However, more commonly propylhexedrine is prepared by reacting methamphetamine with Adams' catalyst, reducing methamphetamine's aromatic ring to a cyclohexyl moiety.

Trade Names 
Propylhexedrine, as a nasal decongestant, is marketed under the trade name Benzedrex. Propylhexedrine has also seen use in Europe as an appetite suppressant, under the trade name Obesin. Additionally, it is found in the anticonvulsant preparation barbexaclone, where its S-isomer (levopropylhexedrine or L-propylhexedrine) is bonded with phenobarbital for the purpose of offsetting the barbiturate-induced sedation. Levopropylhexedrine is also used as an anorectic, under the brand name Eventin.

Society and culture

Legal Status
On the 4th of April 1988, propylhexedrine was designated a controlled substance (Schedule V) in the United States. This was done to satisfy U.S. compliance with an international treaty. However, in 1991 this action was reversed and propylhexedrine was removed from control under the Controlled Substances Act, based on the opinion of the Drug Enforcement Administration that propylhexedrine did not warrant control. The substance has remained unregulated under the Controlled Substances Act in the United States ever since. Furthermore, pursuant to 21 C.F.R 1308.22, Benzedrex is specifically exempt from the Controlled Substances Act.

The drug was formerly a Class C controlled drug in the United Kingdom, but was legalized in 1995.

Recreational use
First reported in the literature in 1970, propylhexedrine is misused by some individuals for its stimulant effects. However, the undesirable side effects of propylhexedrine at recreational doses are often notably worse than other commonly abused stimulants; consequently, making it less desirable for recreational use. Even in areas with rampant stimulant abuse, the use of propylhexedrine was reported as not of significant interest.

Effects
Propylhexedrine has sympathomimetic, adrenergic, vasoconstrictive and psychostimulant effects when taken in higher-than-recommended doses. Effects include increased sweating, talkativeness, mydriasis, emotional lability, anorexia, tachycardia, palpitations, dry mouth, bruxism, anxiety, euphoria or dysphoria, increased aggressiveness, paranoia, headache, dizziness, psychosis, slurred or impaired speech, rarely convulsions and serious heart problems. Propylhexedrine can also cause swelling, dryness and irritation of mucous membranes.

Injection risks
While propylhexedrine has a limited number of administration routes, attempts to extract the drug from nasal decongestant preparations and then inject it have been reported. Recreational use by intravenous injection (IV) is dangerous, and could result in serious bodily harm or death. IV use of propylhexedrine is known to cause mild side-effects such as transient diplopia. More serious and potentially fatal effects such as brainstem dysfunction and sudden death have been recorded in the medical literature.  Propylhexedrine is prepared for IV use by placing  the freebase in a solution with hydrochloric acid, heating the solution, and finally injecting it.

See also 
 Levmetamfetamine
 Phenylpropanolamine
 Ephedrine & Pseudoephedrine
 Phenylephrine

References 

Anorectics
Cyclohexyl compounds
Decongestants
Euphoriants
Norepinephrine-dopamine releasing agents
Stimulants
Sympathomimetics
TAAR1 agonists
Vasoconstrictors
VMAT inhibitors